Drumgelloch railway station is a railway station serving the east of Airdrie, North Lanarkshire, Scotland. The station previously closed in 1956.

History 
The first station on the site was opened on 11 August 1862 by the Bathgate and Coatbridge Railway, and was named Clarkston. It was renamed Clarkston (Lanarks) on 8 June 1953 by British Railways, who closed it on 9 January 1956.

In 2005, the Scottish Executive announced that the closed section of line between the 1989 Drumgelloch station and  would be rebuilt as a double-tracked electrified railway termed the Airdrie–Bathgate rail link. This resulted in the closure of the 1989 Drumgelloch station to be replaced by the new station 550m to the east on the site of the former Clarkston station. When the 1989 station opened, although in the Clarkston area, it took the name Drumgelloch to avoid confusion with the  station on the East Kilbride Line.

It connects the Edinburgh–Bathgate line at Bathgate to the North Clyde Line at Airdrie and opens up a fourth rail link between Glasgow and Edinburgh.

The 2010 station is provided with a 336-space car park including 18 spaces for less able travellers and a dedicated area for cyclists.

The station finally reopened on 6 March 2011.

Services

2010/2011 (from 12 December 2010) 
Following the opening of the line between Airdrie and Bathgate, the basic off-peak daytime service is:
 2tph -  to/from 
 2tph -  to/from 
The evening service is:

 2tph -  to/from 
The Sunday service is:
 2tph -  to/from 

This is subject to sufficient Class 380 being introduced into service to allow the cascade of the Class 334 from the Ayrshire Coast Line to operate the new service.

References

Notes

Sources

External links
 RAILSCOT on Bathgate and Coatbridge Railway
 Clarkston station on navigable OS map
 (A↔B) Airdrie - Bathgate Rail Link Project

Airdrie, North Lanarkshire
Railway stations in North Lanarkshire
Former North British Railway stations
Railway stations in Great Britain opened in 1862
Railway stations in Great Britain closed in 1956
Railway stations in Great Britain opened in 2011
SPT railway stations
Railway stations served by ScotRail
Reopened railway stations in Great Britain